Daniel O'Neill immigrated to the United States from Ireland in 1851, settling in Pittsburgh, Pennsylvania. He became editor and owner of the Pittsburgh Dispatch newspaper along with his brother Eugene M. O'Neill. O'Neill served several terms on the Pittsburgh City Council.

Early life
Daniel, born Daniel O'Connell O'Neill, at Cloughbawn, County Wexford, Ireland on New Year's Day, 1830. His father, Mr. Hugh O'Neill, was principal of a school there. His mother was Kate (Navin) O'Neill. He was the eldest of twelve children.

O'Neill's interest in journalism began at an early age and he was a contributor to the Wexford Independent.

Newspaper career
O'Neill emigrated to the United States in 1851 and settled in Pittsburgh. His first job was as a reporter with the Pittsburgh Dispatch newspaper, then owned by Colonel J. Heron Foster. After five years with the Dispatch, O'Neill took a job as local editor of a rival newspaper, the Chronicle. When the American Civil War broke out he covered the news for the Chronicle as a war correspondent.

Returning to Pittsburgh after the war, O'Neill purchased a share in the Dispatch Over time he and his brother Eugene M O'Neill eventually acquired full control of the Dispatch and Daniel acted as business manager and editor. Perhaps his impact at the paper can be summed up by comments which appeared at the time of his death;

"No more convincing evidence of his indomitable energy could be adduced than that afforded in the success of the " Despatch." The paper had been run down for want of attention, but under the direction of the new firm it rapidly recovered the ground, and has reached its present successful condition. He turned a pigmy sheet into a powerful giant, made his name a household word in Pittsburg, and his paper a welcome visitor. As a writer, Mr. O'Neill possessed what is usually termed a trenchant pen. He was quick, incisive, and if occasion served, bitter. He was aggressive rather than inviting, and when in municipal affairs any scheme lacked his approbation, the public were sure to find it out, and that very soon. He was by no means a polished writer, though his education was classical and his reading varied. His unpolished sentences were wonderfully vigorous, however, and he may be said to have possessed a style almost incapable of imitation." 

In addition to his activities with the newspaper, O'Neill served several terms in the Pittsburgh City Council and was a member of the Electoral College of Pennsylvania.

Family

Daniel O'Neill was first married to Mary O'Neill, daughter of James O'Neill and Rebecca Burchell on 12 April 1853. They did not have children He was next married to Emma Seely (1851–1910). Together they had three children, Florence O'Neill, a writer and composer who eventually joined his father managing the Dispatch, Emily Martha O'Neill and Daniel O'Neill.

Shortly after his death, Daniel's wife Emma married his brother Eugene M. O'Neill.

Death and Burial
About a year before his death, O'Neill completed construction of the family home called Linden House located on the corner of Penn Avenue and Linden Street in Pittsburgh. He died on 30 January 1877 and is interred at the Allegheny Cemetery in Pittsburgh.

Memorial
At O'Neill's gravesite is a memorial statue showing him sitting at an editor's desk honoring his long career as a Pittsburgh newspaperman.

References

External links
 https://web.archive.org/web/20081228024059/http://www.esatclear.ie/~lorcand/history.htm#O%27Neill

19th-century Irish people
1830 births
1877 deaths
People from County Wexford
American war correspondents
Politicians from County Wexford
Irish emigrants to the United States (before 1923)
Pittsburgh City Council members
19th-century American newspaper editors
Editors of Pennsylvania newspapers
Burials at Allegheny Cemetery
American male journalists
19th-century American male writers
19th-century American politicians